This is a list of schools in Central and Western District, Hong Kong.

Secondary schools

 Government
 King's College

 Aided
 Lok Sin Tong Leung Kau Kui College
  (高主教書院)
 St. Clare's Girls' School
 St Joseph's College
 St Louis School
 St. Stephen's Church College
 St Stephen's Girls' College
 Ying Wa Girls' School
	
 Direct Subsidy Scheme
 St. Paul's Co-educational College
 St Paul's College

 Private
 German Swiss International School
 Island Waldorf School (香島華德福學校)

Primary schools

Arranged by alphabetical order of their full names in each category.
 Government
 Bonham Road Government Primary School
 (李陞小學)

 Aided
 Catholic Mission School (天主教總堂區學校)
 Central & Western District St Anthony's School (中西區聖安多尼學校)
 Chiu Sheung School, Hong Kong (香港潮商學校)
 King's College Old Boys' Association Primary School (英皇書院同學會小學)
 King's College Old Boys' Association Primary School No. 2 (英皇書院同學會小學第二校)
 Sacred Heart Canossian School (嘉諾撒聖心學校)
 San Wui Commercial Society School (新會商會學校)
 SKH Kei Yan Primary School (聖公會基恩小學)
 SKH Lui Ming Choi Memorial Primary School (聖公會呂明才紀念小學)
 SKH St Matthew's Primary School (聖公會聖馬太小學)
  (聖公會聖彼得小學)
 St Anthony's School (聖安多尼學校)
 St Charles School (聖嘉祿學校)
 St Stephen's Girls' Primary School (聖士提反女子中學附屬小學)

 English Schools Foundation
 Glenealey School (己連拿小學)
 Peak School

 Private
 Carmel School 
 German Swiss International School
 Island Christian Academy
 Island Waldorf School (香島華德福學校)
 Kau Yan School (救恩學校)
 Sacred Heart Canossian School, Private Section (嘉諾撒聖心學校私立部)
 St Clare's Primary School (聖嘉勒小學)
St. Louis School (Primary Section) (聖類斯中學（小學部）)

Special schools

 Aided
  (香港紅十字會醫院學校) - Affiliated with the Hong Kong Red Cross

References

Lists of schools in Hong Kong
Central and Western District, Hong Kong